Macaranga is a large genus of Old World tropical trees of the family Euphorbiaceae and the only genus in the subtribe Macaranginae (tribe Acalypheae). Native to Africa, Australasia, Asia and various islands of the Indian and Pacific Oceans, the genus comprises over 300 different species. It was first described as a genus in 1806, based on specimens collected on the Island of Mauritius.

Macaranga is noted for being recolonizers. Macaranga species are used as food plants by the larvae of some Lepidoptera species including Endoclita malabaricus. Macaranga species often form symbioses with ant (Formicidae) species (particularly Crematogaster ants of the subgenus Decacrema) because they have hollow stems that can serve as nesting space and occasionally provide nectar. The trees benefit because the ants attack herbivorous insects and either drive them away or feed on them.

Use
 Macaranga gum, a crimson resin, is obtained from Macaranga indica.
 Macaranga tanarius leaves are used by the Rungus indigenous people in Sabah, Malaysia to pack cooked rice into bundles to preserve it and impart a pleasant aroma.

Species 
Plants of the World Online currently includes:

 Macaranga acerifolia Airy Shaw
 Macaranga advena Pax & K.Hoffm.
 Macaranga aenigmatica Whitmore
 Macaranga aetheadenia Airy Shaw
 Macaranga albescens L.M.Perry
 Macaranga alchorneifolia Baker
 Macaranga alchorneoides Pax & Lingelsh.
 Macaranga aleuritoides F.Muell.
 Macaranga allorobinsonii Whitmore
 Macaranga alnifolia Baker
 Macaranga amentifera Whitmore
 Macaranga amissa Airy Shaw
 Macaranga amplifolia Merr.
 Macaranga anceps Airy Shaw
 Macaranga andamanica Kurz
 Macaranga angolensis (Müll.Arg.) Müll.Arg.
 Macaranga angulata S.J.Davies
 Macaranga angustifolia K.Schum. & Lauterb.
 Macaranga ashtonii S.J.Davies
 Macaranga assas Amougou
 Macaranga astrolabica Pax & K.Hoffm.
 Macaranga attenuata J.W.Moore
 Macaranga auctoris Whitmore
 Macaranga baccaureifolia Airy Shaw
 Macaranga bailloniana Müll.Arg.
 Macaranga balabacensis Pax & K.Hoffm.
 Macaranga bancana (Miq.) Müll.Arg.
 Macaranga barkeriana Whitmore
 Macaranga barteri Müll.Arg.
 Macaranga beccariana Merr.
 Macaranga beillei Prain
 Macaranga belensis L.M.Perry
 Macaranga bicolor Müll.Arg.
 Macaranga bifoveata J.J.Sm.
 Macaranga boutonioides Baill.
 Macaranga brachythyrsa Pax & K.Hoffm.
 Macaranga brachytricha Airy Shaw
 Macaranga brevipetiolata Airy Shaw
 Macaranga brooksii Ridl.
 Macaranga brunneofloccosa Pax & K.Hoffm.
 Macaranga bullata Pax & K.Hoffm.
 Macaranga caesariata A.C.Sm.
 Macaranga caladiifolia Becc.
 Macaranga calcicola Airy Shaw
 Macaranga capensis (Baill.) Sim
 Macaranga carolinensis Volkens
 Macaranga carrii L.M.Perry
 Macaranga cassandrae Whitmore
 Macaranga caudata Pax & K.Hoffm.
 Macaranga caudatifolia Elmer
 Macaranga celebica Koord.
 Macaranga chlorolepis Airy Shaw
 Macaranga choiseuliana Airy Shaw
 Macaranga chrysotricha K.Schum. & Lauterb.
 Macaranga cissifolia (Zoll. & Rchb.f.) Müll.Arg.
 Macaranga clavata Warb.
 Macaranga clemensiae L.M.Perry
 Macaranga coggygria Airy Shaw
 Macaranga congestiflora Merr.
 Macaranga conglomerata Brenan
 Macaranga conifera (Rchb.f. & Zoll.) Müll.Arg.
 Macaranga constricta Whitmore & Airy Shaw
 Macaranga cordifolia (Roxb.) Müll.Arg.
 Macaranga coriacea (Baill.) Müll.Arg.
 Macaranga corymbosa (Müll.Arg.) Müll.Arg.
 Macaranga costulata Pax & K.Hoffm.
 Macaranga crassistipulosa Pax & K.Hoffm.
 Macaranga cucullata J.J.Sm.
 Macaranga cuernosensis Elmer
 Macaranga cumingii (Baill.) Müll.Arg.
 Macaranga cuneifolia (Rchb.f. & Zoll.) Müll.Arg.
 Macaranga cupularis Müll.Arg.
 Macaranga cuspidata Boivin ex Baill.
 Macaranga dallachyana (Baill.) Airy Shaw
 Macaranga darbyshirei Airy Shaw
 Macaranga daviesii W.N.Takeuchi
 Macaranga decaryana Leandri
 Macaranga decipiens L.M.Perry
 Macaranga densiflora Warb.
 Macaranga denticulata (Blume) Müll.Arg.
 Macaranga depressa (Müll.Arg.) Müll.Arg.
 Macaranga dibeleensis De Wild.
 Macaranga didymocarpa Whitmore
 Macaranga diepenhorstii (Miq.) Müll.Arg.
 Macaranga digyna (Wight) Müll.Arg.
 Macaranga dioica (G.Forst.) Müll.Arg.
 Macaranga domatiosa Airy Shaw
 Macaranga ducis Whitmore
 Macaranga ebolowana Pax & K.Hoffm.
 Macaranga echinocarpa Baker
 Macaranga eloba Pax & K.Hoffm.
 Macaranga endertii Whitmore
 Macaranga esseriana W.N.Takeuchi
 Macaranga eymae L.M.Perry
 Macaranga faiketo Whitmore
 Macaranga fallacina Pax & K.Hoffm.
 Macaranga ferruginea Baker
 Macaranga fragrans L.M.Perry
 Macaranga fulva Airy Shaw
 Macaranga gabunica Prain
 Macaranga galorei Whitmore
 Macaranga gamblei Hook.f.
 Macaranga gigantea (Rchb.f. & Zoll.) Müll.Arg.
 Macaranga gigantifolia Merr.
 Macaranga glaberrima (Hassk.) Airy Shaw
 Macaranga glabra (Juss.) Pax & K.Hoffm.
 Macaranga glandibracteolata S.J.Davies
 Macaranga glandulifera L.M.Perry
 Macaranga gracilis Pax & K.Hoffm.
 Macaranga graeffeana Pax & K.Hoffm.
 Macaranga grallata McPherson
 Macaranga grandifolia (Blanco) Merr.
 Macaranga grayana Müll.Arg.
 Macaranga griffithiana Müll.Arg.
 Macaranga hageniana Gilli
 Macaranga hartleyana Whitmore
 Macaranga harveyana (Müll.Arg.) Müll.Arg.
 Macaranga havilandii Airy Shaw
 Macaranga hengkyana Whitmore
 Macaranga henryi (Pax & K.Hoffm.) Rehder
 Macaranga herculis Whitmore
 Macaranga heterophylla (Müll.Arg.) Müll.Arg.
 Macaranga heudelotii Baill.
 Macaranga hexandra (Roxb.) Müll.Arg.
 Macaranga heynei I.M.Johnst.
 Macaranga hispida (Blume) Müll.Arg.
 Macaranga hoffmannii L.M.Perry
 Macaranga hosei King ex Hook.f.
 Macaranga huahineensis J.Florence
 Macaranga hullettii King ex Hook.f.
 Macaranga humbertii Leandri
 Macaranga hurifolia Beille
 Macaranga hypoleuca (Rchb.f. & Zoll.) Müll.Arg.
 Macaranga hystrichogyne Airy Shaw
 Macaranga inamoena F.Muell. ex Benth.
 Macaranga indica Wight
 Macaranga indistincta Whitmore
 Macaranga induta L.M.Perry
 Macaranga inermis Pax & K.Hoffm.
 Macaranga intonsa Whitmore
 Macaranga involucrata Baill.
 Macaranga javanica (Blume) Müll.Arg.
 Macaranga johannium Whitmore
 Macaranga kanehirae Hosok.
 Macaranga kilimandscharica Pax
 Macaranga kinabaluensis Airy Shaw
 Macaranga kingii Hook.f.
 Macaranga klaineana Pierre ex Prain
 Macaranga kostermansii L.M.Perry
 Macaranga kurzii (Kuntze) Pax & K.Hoffm.
 Macaranga laciniata Whitmore & Airy Shaw
 Macaranga lamellata Whitmore
 Macaranga lanceolata Pax & K.Hoffm.
 Macaranga letestui Pellegr.
 Macaranga leytensis Merr.
 Macaranga lineata Airy Shaw
 Macaranga loheri Elmer
 Macaranga longicaudata L.M.Perry
 Macaranga longipetiolata De Wild.
 Macaranga longistipulata (Kurz ex Teijsm. & Binn.) Müll.Arg.
 Macaranga lophostigma Chiov.
 Macaranga louisiadum Airy Shaw
 Macaranga lowii King ex Hook.f.
 Macaranga lugubris Whitmore
 Macaranga lumiensis Whitmore
 Macaranga lutescens (Pax & Lingelsh.) Pax
 Macaranga macropoda Baker
 Macaranga magna Turrill
 Macaranga magnifolia L.M.Perry
 Macaranga magnistipulosa Pax
 Macaranga mappa (L.) Müll.Arg.
 Macaranga marikoensis A.C.Sm.
 Macaranga mauritiana Bojer ex Baill.
 Macaranga megacarpa Airy Shaw
 Macaranga meiophylla S.Moore
 Macaranga melanosticta Airy Shaw
 Macaranga mellifera Prain
 Macaranga membranacea Müll.Arg.
 Macaranga minahassae Whitmore
 Macaranga misimae Airy Shaw
 Macaranga mista S.Moore
 Macaranga modesta Pax & K.Hoffm.
 Macaranga monandra Müll.Arg.
 Macaranga monostyla Whistler
 Macaranga montana Merr.
 Macaranga motleyana (Müll.Arg.) Müll.Arg.
 Macaranga myriantha Müll.Arg.
 Macaranga myriolepida Baker
 Macaranga necopina Whitmore
 Macaranga neobritannica Airy Shaw
 Macaranga neodenticulata Whitmore
 Macaranga nicobarica N.P.Balakr. & Chakr.
 Macaranga noblei Elmer
 Macaranga novoguineensis J.J.Sm.
 Macaranga nusatenggarensis Whitmore
 Macaranga oblongifolia Baill.
 Macaranga obovata Boivin ex Baill.
 Macaranga occidentalis (Müll.Arg.) Müll.Arg.
 Macaranga ovatifolia Merr.
 Macaranga pachyphylla Müll.Arg.
 Macaranga palustris Whitmore
 Macaranga papuana (J.J.Sm.) Pax & K.Hoffm.
 Macaranga parabicolor Whitmore
 Macaranga parvibracteata Pax & K.Hoffm.
 Macaranga paxii Prain
 Macaranga pearsonii Merr.
 Macaranga peltata (Roxb.) Müll.Arg.
 Macaranga pentaloba S.J.Davies
 Macaranga pepysiana Whitmore
 Macaranga petanostyla Airy Shaw
 Macaranga pierreana Prain
 Macaranga pilosula Airy Shaw
 Macaranga platyclada Pax & K.Hoffm.
 Macaranga pleioneura Airy Shaw
 Macaranga pleiostemon Pax & K.Hoffm.
 Macaranga pleytei L.M.Perry
 Macaranga poggei Pax
 Macaranga polyadenia Pax & K.Hoffm.
 Macaranga polyneura Gilli
 Macaranga praestans Airy Shaw
 Macaranga pruinosa (Miq.) Müll.Arg.
 Macaranga puberula Heine
 Macaranga punctata K.Schum.
 Macaranga puncticulata Gage
 Macaranga quadriglandulosa Warb.
 Macaranga racemohispida Whitmore
 Macaranga racemosa Baker
 Macaranga raivavaeensis H.St.John
 Macaranga ramiflora Elmer
 Macaranga rarispina Whitmore
 Macaranga recurvata Gage
 Macaranga reiteriana Pax & K.Hoffm.
 Macaranga repandodentata Airy Shaw
 Macaranga rhizinoides (Blume) Müll.Arg.
 Macaranga rhodonema Airy Shaw
 Macaranga ribesioides Baker
 Macaranga robinsonii Merr.
 Macaranga rorokae Whitmore
 Macaranga rostrata Heine
 Macaranga rufescens S.J.Davies
 Macaranga rufibarbis Warb.
 Macaranga saccifera Pax
 Macaranga salicifolia Airy Shaw
 Macaranga salomonensis L.M.Perry
 Macaranga sampsonii Hance
 Macaranga sandsii Whitmore
 Macaranga sarcocarpa Airy Shaw
 Macaranga schweinfurthii Pax
 Macaranga secunda Müll.Arg.
 Macaranga seemannii (Müll.Arg.) Müll.Arg.
 Macaranga serratifolia Whitmore
 Macaranga setosa Gage
 Macaranga siamensis S.J.Davies
 Macaranga similis Pax & K.Hoffm.
 Macaranga sinensis (Baill.) Müll.Arg.
 Macaranga spathicalyx Whitmore & S.J.Davies
 Macaranga sphaerophylla Baker
 Macaranga spinosa Müll.Arg.
 Macaranga staudtii Pax
 Macaranga stellimontium Whitmore
 Macaranga stenophylla Pax & K.Hoffm.
 Macaranga sterrophylla L.M.Perry
 Macaranga stipulosa Müll.Arg.
 Macaranga stonei Whitmore
 Macaranga strigosa Pax & K.Hoffm.
 Macaranga strigosissima Airy Shaw
 Macaranga subdentata Benth.
 Macaranga subpeltata K.Schum. & Lauterb.
 Macaranga suleensis Whitmore
 Macaranga sumatrana Müll.Arg.
 Macaranga suwo Whitmore
 Macaranga sylvatica Elmer
 Macaranga taitensis (Müll.Arg.) Müll.Arg.
 Macaranga tanarius (L.) Müll.Arg.
 Macaranga tchibangensis Pellegr.
 Macaranga tentaculata Airy Shaw
 Macaranga tessellata Gage
 Macaranga teysmannii (Zoll.) Müll.Arg.
 Macaranga thomasii Whitmore
 Macaranga thompsonii Merr.
 Macaranga thorelii Gagnep.
 Macaranga trachyphylla Airy Shaw
 Macaranga trichanthera L.M.Perry
 Macaranga trichocarpa (Zoll.) Müll.Arg.
 Macaranga triloba (Thunb.) Müll.Arg.
 Macaranga truncata J.Florence
 Macaranga tsonane Whitmore
 Macaranga umbrosa S.J.Davies
 Macaranga uxoris Whitmore
 Macaranga vanderystii De Wild.
 Macaranga vedeliana (Baill.) Müll.Arg.
 Macaranga velutina (Rchb.f. & Zoll.) Müll.Arg.
 Macaranga velutiniflora S.J.Davies
 Macaranga venosa J.W.Moore
 Macaranga vermoesenii De Wild.
 Macaranga versteeghii L.M.Perry
 Macaranga vieillardii (Müll.Arg.) Müll.Arg.
 Macaranga villosula Pax & K.Hoffm.
 Macaranga vitiensis Pax & K.Hoffm.
 Macaranga warburgiana Pax & K.Hoffm.
 Macaranga waturandangii Whitmore
 Macaranga whitmorei Airy Shaw
 Macaranga winkleri Pax & K.Hoffm.
 Macaranga winkleriella Whitmore
 Macaranga yakasii Airy Shaw

References
	

 
Euphorbiaceae genera